

Al-Adiliyah Mosque or Dukaginzâde Mehmed Pasha mosque was a külliye in Aleppo, located to the southwest of the Citadel, in "Al-Jalloum" district of the ancient city, few meters away from Al-Saffahiyah mosque. The mosque was endowed by the Dukakinzade Mehmed Pasha in 1556. Dukakinzade Mehmed Pasha was the Albanian-Ottoman governor-general of Aleppo from 1551 until 1553 when he was appointed as governor-general of Egypt. He died in 1557 and the mosque was not completed until 1565-66 (AH 973). It was considered to be one of the oldest mosques of the Ottoman period in Aleppo after the Khusruwiyah Mosque.

The complex had been built at the southern entrance of the covered suq of ancient Aleppo. 

The mosque became known as the Adiliyya because of its position near to the governor's palace, the Dar al-Adl, also known as the Dar al-Saada.

The mosque has a large domed prayer hall preceded by a double portico. Above the windows on the north side and in the prayer hall are brightly coloured tiled lunette panels. These were probably imported from Iznik in Turkey.

It was almost entirely destroyed during the Battle of Aleppo in summer 2014 or 2015.

Gallery

References

Further reading

External links

Mosques in Aleppo
Mausoleums in Syria
Madrasas in Aleppo
Ottoman mosques in Syria
Ottoman architecture in Aleppo
16th-century mosques
1556 establishments in the Ottoman Empire
Mimar Sinan buildings
Destroyed mosques